Ruaidhrí mac Coscraigh was King of South Connacht and of Uí Briúin and a third great-grandson of the eponym of Clann Cosgraigh.  Ruaidhri is mentioned in the Annals of Inisfallen and Tigernach as well as the Leabhar na nGenealach.

Ruaidhrí was slain fighting Conchobar mac Mael Sechnaill, King of Corcu Modruad and Mac Comhaltan Ua Cleirigh of the Uí Fiachrach Aidhne in 993.

References

 Irish Kings and High-Kings, Francis John Byrne (2001), Dublin: Four Courts Press, 
 CELT: Corpus of Electronic Texts at University College Cork

People from County Galway
10th-century Irish monarchs